Glisno  (formerly German Gleißen) is a village in the administrative district of Gmina Lubniewice, within Sulęcin County, Lubusz Voivodeship, in western Poland.

References

Glisno